The women's doubles event at the 2003 Pan American Games was held at Centro Nacional de Tenis in Santo Domingo from August 6 to August 9.

Brazilians Bruna Colósio and Joana Cortez won the gold medal by defeating the Puerto Rican pair of Kristina Brandi and Vilmarie Castellvi in the final, 6–4, 7–5. The Bronze medal was awarded to both semifinalists.

Medalists

Seeds
  /  (quarterfinals)
  /  (champion, gold medalist)
  /  (semifinalist, bronze medalist)
  /  (quarterfinals)

Draw

References

Draw
Draw constructed from daily results taken from 2003 Pan Archive UOL.

 
 
 
 

2003 in tennis
Women's Doubles